This article lists the Labour Representation Committee's election results in UK parliamentary elections.  The Labour Representation was the forerunner of the Labour Party.  It was founded in 1900 and became the Labour Party in 1906, shortly after that year's general election.

Summary of general election performance

Election results

1900 general election

Hardie stood in two constituencies and was elected in Merthyr Tydfil, where he placed second in a two-seat constituency; Bell was similarly elected in Derby.

By-elections, 1900–1906

1906 general election

Burgess, Clynes, Coit, Hardie, Jowett, MacDonald, Parker, Snowden, Summerbell and Williams were sponsored by the Independent Labour Party.  Gill, Hardie, MacDonald, Parker, Snowden, Summerbell and Wilkie were elected by taking second place in a two-seat constituency.

See also
 Independent Labour Party election results
 Social Democratic Federation election results

References

Election results by party in the United Kingdom
Representation Committee election results